was a town located in Kita District, Ehime Prefecture, Japan.

In 2003, the town had an estimated population of 8,765 and a density of 117.19 persons per km². The total area was 74.79 km².

On January 11, 2005, Nagahama, along with the town of Hijikawa and the village of Kawabe (all from Kita District), was merged into the expanded city of Ōzu and no longer exists as an independent municipality.

Located on the coast, some of Nagahama's industries include fishing, logging, and a traditional wooden sandal factory. It is renowned in its area for its fugu (blowfish) sushi.

There is an observatory in Nagahama from which a view of the Hijikawa River feeding into the Seto Inland Sea can be seen. There is a famous old drawbridge that is the oldest of its kind in Japan still in use. Iyo-Nagahama Station serves Nagahama and has been featured in several movies.  

Nagahama is also known as Iyo-Nagahama and is not to be confused with Nagahama City in Shiga Prefecture.

Climate

References

External links
Official website of Ōzu 

Dissolved municipalities of Ehime Prefecture